Saint Joe is an unincorporated community along the Saint Joe River within the St. Joe National Forest in northeastern Benewah County, Idaho, United States.

History
A post office called Saint Joe was established in 1888, and remained in operation until it was discontinued in 1945. The community took its name from the nearby Saint Joe River.

References

External links

Unincorporated communities in Benewah County, Idaho
Unincorporated communities in Idaho